Balterley is a civil parish in the district of Newcastle-under-Lyme, Staffordshire, England.  It contains six buildings that are recorded in the National Heritage List for England.  Of these, one is listed at Grade II*, the middle of the three grades, and the others are at Grade II, the lowest grade.  The parish contains the village of Balterley and the surrounding countryside.  The listed buildings consist of two houses, a farmhouse, a pigeon house, a milepost, and a church.


Key

Buildings

References

Citations

Sources

Lists of listed buildings in Staffordshire
Borough of Newcastle-under-Lyme